Albert Corbett Mumford (7 June 1865 – 1926) was an English footballer who played in The Football League for Sheffield Wednesday., and scored Wednesday's goal in the 1890 FA Cup Final.

References

1865 births
1926 deaths
English footballers
Sheffield Wednesday F.C. players
English Football League players
Association football defenders
FA Cup Final players